John S. Leiber is an American lawyer and politician from the state of Wisconsin. A Republican, he is the 37th state treasurer of Wisconsin, having been elected in the 2022 election.

Early life and career
Leiber graduated from Prairie High School in Racine, Wisconsin. He earned a bachelor's degree in history from University of Wisconsin–Parkside and worked for several years as a teacher in the Racine Unified School District.

In 2009, Leiber became president of the parks and recreation commission in the neighboring village of Caledonia, Wisconsin, and was then employed as a legislative aide in the Wisconsin State Assembly from 2013 through 2016. During these years, he was active in the Republican Party of Racine County, and worked on behalf of the Caledonia school secession movement—that unsuccessful movement sought to separate Caledonia's schools from the Racine Unified School District.

Electoral career
In 2018, Leiber ran for the Republican nomination for Wisconsin State Assembly in the 62nd Assembly district.  He lost the primary to Racine school board president Robert Wittke, who went on to win the general election. After his defeat in the Assembly primary, Leiber worked briefly at the Wisconsin Department of Revenue as a tax representative, and then earn his Juris Doctor from the University of Wisconsin Law School and began practicing law.

Leiber ran for office again in 2022, seeking the Republican nomination for Wisconsin State Treasurer. He defeated Orlando Owens with 67% of the vote in the Republican primary and went on to narrowly defeat the Democratic candidate, Aaron Richardson, in the general election. He was sworn into office on January 3, 2023.

Personal life and family
Leiber and his wife, Diane, live in Cottage Grove, Wisconsin. They have three children.

Electoral history

Wisconsin Assembly (2018)

| colspan="6" style="text-align:center;background-color: #e9e9e9;"| Republican Primary, August 14, 2018

Wisconsin Treasurer (2022)

| colspan="6" style="text-align:center;background-color: #e9e9e9;"| Republican Primary, August 9, 2022

| colspan="6" style="text-align:center;background-color: #e9e9e9;"| General Election, November 7, 2022 (unofficial results)

References

External links

|-

 

Living people
People from Cottage Grove, Wisconsin
State treasurers of Wisconsin
University of Wisconsin–Parkside alumni
University of Wisconsin Law School alumni
Wisconsin Republicans
Year of birth missing (living people)